The Honorary Title "Honoured Inventor of the RSFSR" was the highest award for inventors of the Russian Soviet Federative Socialist Republic of the USSR. It got established on April 20, 1961 and was awarded to individuals for inventions of national importance and their major contribution to technological progress and long activities in engineering or science.

Notable Recipients (partial list)
 Nikolay Mikhaylovich Afanasyev (1968)
 B. G. Ignat'ev
 Gavriil Ilizarov (1965), (1975)
 E.I.Kazantsev
 Boris Laskonin (1964)
 Ivan Ivanovich Manilo
 Alexander Nadiradze (1973)
 I. I. Sobol
 L. I. Trachtenberg

See also 
 Honoured Inventor of the USSR

References

Honorary titles of the Soviet Union
Honorary titles of Russia
Civil awards and decorations of the Soviet Union
Awards established in 1961